Meiacanthus bundoon, the Bundoon blenny, is a species of combtooth blenny from the Pacific Ocean where it is known from Fiji and Tonga.  This species grows to a length of  TL.

References

bundoon
Fish of the Pacific Ocean
Fish described in 1976